The Basilica of Our Lady of Copacabana is a 17th-century Spanish colonial shrine that houses the image of the Virgen de Copacabana. It is located in the town of Copacabana, Bolivia on the shores of Lake Titicaca near the Altiplano region. Our Lady of Copacabana is the patron saint of Bolivia.

Shortly following the introduction of the Virgin's image into Copacabana, three friars of the Order of Saint Augustine took over management of the original shrine on the Island of the Sun, establishing a monastery and maintaining a detailed record of the Virgin's miracles. The shrine was constructed at the foot of a small, steep, hill in a location formerly known as the Temple of the Sun--an area sacred to the Inca--it remains as one of two principle sacred places to both the indigenous peoples and Catholics alike; the other location being the Virgin of Urkupiña near Cochabamba, Bolivia.

The original chapel was built in 1583, following the completion of the original statue of the patroness by Francisco Yupanquie in 1576. The current building was built between 1669 and 1679 by the Spaniard architect Francisco Jiménez de Siguenza replacing the former church. It would then be officially elevated to the rank of Basilica in 1940, as it remains to this day.

Nerdio

The hilltop overlooking Lake Titicaca was rededicated as a "calvario" or replica of Calvary and is topped by the Stations of the Seven Sorrows of Mary and an altar with a depiction of the crucifixion of Jesus.  It is a major centre of worship throughout the region during Holy Week, especially on Good Friday and Easter Sunday.

April 2013 Robbery
In the early hours of Monday, 22 April 2013, the Basilica of Our Lady of Copacabana was robbed and the image of the Virgen de Copacabana was stripped of her gold and silver accessories. Initial reports indicate that twenty-eight items, including the sculpture of the baby Jesus, were removed from the Virgen de Copacabana by thieves who entered the building using a ladder stolen from a nearby telecommunications station.

References

Basilica churches in Bolivia
Roman Catholic churches in Bolivia
Shrines to the Virgin Mary
Buildings and structures in La Paz Department (Bolivia)
Roman Catholic shrines in Bolivia
17th-century Roman Catholic church buildings in Bolivia
Roman Catholic churches completed in 1679